Pleasure Point is a small suburb, in south-western Sydney, in the state of New South Wales, Australia. Pleasure Point is 27 km south west of the Sydney central business district, in the local government area of the City of Liverpool. Its postcode is 2172.

Geography
Pleasure Point is a geographical formation on the southern bank of the Georges River which lends its name to the suburb. The only adjacent suburbs are Voyager Point, Sandy Point and Holsworthy. East Hills and Picnic Point are located on the opposite bank of the Georges River. The suburb has been around for more than 30 years. The boundaries of the suburb were altered by the creation of the suburb of Voyager Point in 1987. The Holsworthy Army Base is located near Pleasure Point.

See also
A Pleasure Point can also be found in Santa Cruz, California.

References

Suburbs of Sydney
City of Liverpool (New South Wales)